Not Afraid of Life: My Journey So Far is a memoir written by Bristol Palin and Nancy French. The book was released in June 2011.

Background
In Not Afraid of Life, Bristol Palin discusses  her personal life, including tensions with the McCain family, and losing her virginity.

Reception
The book received mixed reviews. Some commentators criticised Palin for releasing a memoir at the age of 20.

In July 2011, Not Afraid of Life reached #21 on The New York Times Best Seller list for hardcover nonfiction.

Controversy 
Soon after the book's release, comedian and television host Bill Maher joked that Not Afraid of Life had the working title "Whoops, There's a Dick in Me".

See also
Bristol Palin: Life's a Tripp

References

2011 non-fiction books
American political books
Books about politics of the United States
Current affairs books
American memoirs
William Morrow and Company books